Ulez or ULEZ may refer to:
 Ułęż, a village in Poland
 Gmina Ułęż, the administrative unit
 Ulëz, a town in Albania
 Ulëz Hydroelectric Power Station
 Ultra Low Emission Zone in London, England